Culley Rikard (May 9, 1914 – February 25, 2000) was a professional baseball player. He played three seasons in Major League Baseball, 1941, 1942, and 1947, with the Pittsburgh Pirates of the National League, primarily as an outfielder.

After a handful of games as a pinch hitter the first two seasons, he was drafted for World War II before the 1943 season.

His best season was in 1947 when he played in 109 games with 324 at bats as a fourth outfielder. He batted .287 with four home runs and 32 runs batted in. On June 5, 1947, in a game against the Brooklyn Dodgers he hit a line drive to center field. All-Star outfielder Pete Reiser caught the ball, but collided with the Ebbets Field wall, knocking him unconscious. Reiser famously received last rites by the Catholic Church, but eventually managed to recover with a concussion. The injury also caused a case of vertigo which damaged his career.

Rikard was released to Indianapolis of the American Association after the 47 season. Rikard was later traded to the Pacific Coast League San Francisco Seals during the 1949 season for Dino Restelli.

Rikard died in Memphis, Tennessee.

References

External links

1914 births
2000 deaths
Albuquerque Dukes players
United States Army Air Forces personnel of World War II
Baseball players from Mississippi
Chattanooga Lookouts players
Cleveland A's players
Cleveland Bengals players
Columbus Bengals players
Greenville Bucks players
Hollywood Stars players
Indianapolis Indians players
Kansas City Blues (baseball) players
Major League Baseball outfielders
Memphis Chickasaws players
Memphis Tigers baseball coaches
Monroe Twins players
Pittsburgh Pirates players
San Francisco Seals (baseball) players
Sportspeople from Oxford, Mississippi
Texarkana Liners players